This is a list of Tennessee State Tigers football players in the NFL Draft.

Key

Selections

References

Tennessee State

Tennessee State Tigers NFL Draft